Don't Sleep on Us is a live album released in 1991 by the Washington, D.C.-based go-go band Junk Yard Band. The album consists of thirteen tracks, including the songs "Heavy One", "Cold Crankin'", and "Take Me Out to See Junkyard".

Track listing

A Side
"Let Us Get On Down" – 4:52
"Cold Crankin'" – 7:53
"Heavy One" – 7:17
"Make No Fuss" – 4:27

B Side
"Ha Ha, Yuck Yuck Yuck Yah" – 6:53
"I Want to Be Loved" – 6:08
"(You're) Jigglin' Baby" – 6:45
"Tear the House Down" – 4:37
"Take Me Out to See Junkyard" – 4:34

References

External links
Don't Sleep on Us at Discogs
Don't Sleep on Us at Last.fm

1991 live albums
Junk Yard Band albums